HMS Trent is a Batch 2  offshore patrol vessel, named after the River Trent. This is the sixth Royal Navy ship named Trent. She is the third Batch 2 River-class vessel to be commissioned and is forward deployed long-term to Gibraltar.

Construction
On 6 November 2013 it was announced that the Royal Navy had signed an agreement in principle to build three new offshore patrol vessels, based on the River-class design, at a fixed price of £348 million including spares and support. In August 2014, BAE Systems signed the contract to build the ships on the Clyde in Scotland. The Ministry of Defence stated that the Batch 2 ships are capable of being used for constabulary duties such as "counter-terrorism, counter-piracy and anti-smuggling operations". According to BAE Systems, the vessels are designed to deploy globally, conducting anti-piracy, counter-terrorism and anti-smuggling tasks currently conducted by frigates and destroyers.

Steel was cut, marking the start of construction of Trent, on 7 October 2015 at the BAE Systems Govan shipyard in Glasgow. Trent was officially named – the equivalent to a traditional slipway launch – on the south bank of the Clyde at BAE's Govan yard on 13 March 2018, completing her first sea trials in June the following year. She made her first entry into Portsmouth Harbour on 19 December 2019.

Operational history
She was commissioned on 3 August 2020 and deployed to the Mediterranean for NATO Operation Sea Guardian, before returning to the UK in September. The 2021 defence white paper announced that HMS Trent would be permanently based at Gibraltar as part of the Gibraltar Squadron for operations in the Mediterranean Sea and in the Gulf of Guinea. Trent arrived at Gibraltar in April 2021.

Soon after her arrival, Trent deployed to the Black Sea for training with the Ukrainian and allied navies. Later in the year, the patrol ship deployed to the Gulf of Guinea on counter-piracy operations. The ship went into dry dock in Gibraltar in mid-2022 for a maintenance and upgrade period and was to have returned to active operations in October. However, a further initially undisclosed problem forced her to return to dry dock shortly thereafter. That same month, the ship's commanding officer was removed from his post over alleged inappropriate texts to a female subordinate. In December the ship again returned to dry dock for an unknown reason.

References

External links
 HMS Trent

 

River-class patrol vessels
Ships built on the River Clyde
Ships of the Fishery Protection Squadron of the United Kingdom
2018 ships